Cute Girl, also known as Lovable You, is a 1980 romantic drama film directed by Taiwanese director Hou Hsiao-hsien, starring Kenny Bee, Anthony Chan and Fong Fei-fei. It was Hou Hsiao-hsien's first feature film. A student of the French language falls in love with an engineer.

References

External links 
 

1980s Mandarin-language films
1980 films
1980 romantic drama films
Films directed by Hou Hsiao-hsien
Taiwanese romantic drama films
1980 directorial debut films